Acleris chloroma is a species of moth of the family Tortricidae. It is found in Uganda.

The wingspan is about 26 mm. The ground colour of the forewings is verdigris green, dotted and strigulated with black. The hindwings are brownish.

References

Endemic fauna of Uganda
Moths described in 1993
chloroma
Moths of Africa